Jichu Quta (Aymara jichu ichhu (Peruvian feather grass), quta lake, "ichhu lake", also spelled Jicho Kkota) is a mountain north of the Cordillera Real in the Andes of Bolivia which reaches a height of approximately . It is located in the La Paz Department, Larecaja Province, Sorata Municipality, at the border with the Quiabaya Municipality. Jichu Quta lies south of Saywani at a lake named Quriwari. The Wayllani Jawira originates near the mountain. It flows to the west.

References 

Mountains of La Paz Department (Bolivia)